Guillaume Lejean (1828 in Plouégat-Guérand - 1 February 1871) was a Breton of French citizenship who was an explorer and ethnographer.

Works 
Ethnographie de la Turquie d'Europe (French for "Ethnography of Turkey of Europe."). Gotha: Justus Perthes, 1861
Voyage aux deux Nils (French for "Travel to the two Niles"). Paris, 1865–68
Théodore II, le nouvel empire d'Abyssinie et les intérèts francais (French for "Theodore II, the new empire of Abyssinia and the French interests"). Paris, 1865

External links

 
 

French explorers
1828 births
1871 deaths